Tat'yana Avenirovna Proskuriakova ( – August 30, 1985) was a Russian-American Mayanist scholar and archaeologist who contributed significantly to the deciphering of Maya hieroglyphs, the writing system of the pre-Columbian Maya civilization of Mesoamerica.

Born in Tomsk, Proskuriakova moved to the USA with her parents in 1916. In 1924, she accepted American citizenship. She graduated from the College of Architecture at Pennsylvania State University (1930). In 1936-1937, she took part in two seasons of an archaeological expedition to Piedras Negras (Guatemala). In 1939, she made scientific trips to Copán and Chichen Itza. From 1940 to 1958, she was a staff member of the Carnegie Institute and developed methods of dating ancient Mayan monuments based on the peculiarities of the fine arts style. From 1950 to 1955, she worked at the excavations of Mayapan. In 1958, Proskouriakoff moved to the Peabody Museum at Harvard University, where she worked until her retirement in 1977. In her final years of life, she suffered from Alzheimer's disease.

The most significant scientific contribution of Tatiana Proskouriakoff is considered to be the consistent application of the structural method to Mayan inscriptions of the classical period, as a result of which she proved that historical events were recorded on the monuments. Publications about new method application have been published since 1960. In 1967, she wrote the preface for the English translation of Yuri Knorozov's monograph "Writing of Maya Indians". However, she did not try to voice Maya texts, although she recognized the method of deciphering the written language.

Her work laid a solid foundation for understanding Mayan historical texts and reconstructing the political history of Mayan city-states. In 1974, she prepared a catalog of 1000 jade products from the sacred cenote Chichen Itza, kept in the Peabody Museum. Proskouriakoff worked for over 20 years on the consolidated history of the Maya, which was published posthumously in 1994. She was a full member of the American Anthropological Association. In 1971, she was named Woman of the Year in the Pennsylvania State University nomination. Proskouriakoff is an Honorary Doctor of Tulane University (1977). She was awarded the Alfred V. Kidder Medal (1962) and Order of the Quetzal from the Guatemalan government in 1984. In 1998, part of Proskouriakoff's ashes was buried in the "J-23" building on the Acropolis in Piedras Negras, which she depicted in her archaeological reconstructions.

Early life

She was born in Tomsk, in the Tomsk Governorate of the Russian Empire, to a chemist and his physician wife. The family traveled to the United States in 1915, her father being asked by Tsar Nicholas II to oversee the production of munitions for World War I. The Russian Revolution forced the family to remain permanently. She was to visit Russia only once after that, to meet the Mayanist Yuri Knorozov.

She was devoted to a career in interpreting art, architecture, and hieroglyphics. She could read proficiently at age 3. She had a talent for drawing and received lessons in art and watercolor.

The family lived for a while in Ohio, then moved to the Philadelphia area, settling down in Lansdowne, Pennsylvania.

In 1926, Tatiana enrolled at the Pennsylvania State College School of Architecture and graduated as the only female in her class in 1930. Initially educated as an architect, she later went on to work for Linton Satterthwaite and for the University of Pennsylvania Museum at the Maya site of Piedras Negras in 1936–37. The Piedras Negras site lies between Mexico and Guatemala in the Usumacinta region. Specializing in architecture, Tatiana's first assignment at Piedras Negras was to illustrate the architectural ruins of the site. These initial travels would be the start of her life's work, as she found a passion for studying the ancient Maya. Upon her return to Philadelphia, she made a reconstruction drawing of the Piedras Negras acropolis which caught the attention of Silvanus Morley. Morley realized the young architect's remarkable ability to visualize a ruined structure as it once stood and render it with artistic precision. This would later lead to Tatiana's collaboration with Morley.

Career

While enrolled in graduate studies at the University of Pennsylvania, Proskouriakoff prepared archeological illustrations as a volunteer at the University Museum.  Through her work with the museum's Assistant Curator of the American Section, Linton Satterthwaite, Proskouriakoff received an invitation in 1936 to join the museum's excavation work at the Maya site of Piedras Negras.

Although Proskouriakoff never received a degree in the field of Maya studies, her dedication and ability for it led to her receiving positions at the Carnegie Institution in Washington D.C., then later at Harvard University. Her position at Carnegie was procured when Sylvanus Morley saw the panoramic reconstruction on a visit to the museum; he was impressed and prevailed upon her to make more for the Carnegie Institution of Washington. Unable to get the institution to hire her, he raised funds to enable Proskouriakoff to travel to Copán and Yucatán, which she did in 1939. Returning after she completed the drawings, she was given the post of a research associate at the Institution in the early 1940s.

She soon became involved in Maya hieroglyphs and made significant contributions to the understanding of Mayan written language. For example, her 1942 scholarly analysis of the hieroglyphics at the Takalik Abaj ruins in Guatemala establish that the site was in part Maya, settling a debate at that time. Her greatest contribution was considered the breakthrough for Maya hieroglyphic decipherment in the late 1950s and early 1960s. While researching the chronology of changing styles of Maya sculpture, she discovered that the dates shown on the monumental stelae were actually historical, the birth, accession, and death dates for Maya rulers. Analyzing the pattern of dates and hieroglyphs, she was able to demonstrate a sequence of seven rulers who ruled over a span of two hundred years. Knowing the context of the inscriptions, Maya epigraphers were then able to decipher the hieroglyphs.

She became honorary curator, Maya art, of the Peabody Museum in 1958. 
Tatiana Proskouriakoff died in Cambridge, Massachusetts, on August 30, 1985. She was 76 years old.  On Easter Sunday 1998, after waiting more than a decade for political tensions to ease along the Usumacinta River, friend and colleague David Stuart carried Tatiana's ashes to Piedras Negras, where they were interred at the summit of the Acropolis, the group of structures in Tania's first and perhaps most famous reconstruction drawing, the same one that launched her career.

Awards and recognition
 Alfred V. Kidder Medal for eminence in American archaeology, 1962
 Woman of the Year by Penn State, 1971
 Order of the Quetzal, Guatemala's highest honor, 1980
 Honorary Doctorate of Laws from Tulane University, 1977
 Elected to membership in the American Philosophical Society, 1981

Published works

Proskouriakoff's publications include:
 An Inscription on a Jade Probably Carved at Piedras Negras Notes on Middle American Archaeology and Ethnology II, 1944
 An Album of Maya Architecture, 1946
 Middle American Art, 1950
 A Study of Classic Maya Sculpture Carnegie Institute of Washington Publication No. 593, 1950
 Varieties of Classic Central Veracruz Sculpture American Anthropology and History LVIII, 1954
 Historical Implications of a Pattern of Dates at Piedras Negras, Guatemala American Antiquity XXV, 1960
 Portraits of Women in Maya Art, 1961
 Lords of the Maya Realm Expedition Magazine IV(1) 1961
 Mayapán, Yucatán, Mexico (with H E D Pollock, A L Smith and R L Roys) Carnegie Institute of Washington Publication No. 619, 1962
 Historical Data in the Inscriptions of Yaxchilan, Part 1 Estudios de Cultura Maya III, 1963
 Historical Data in the Inscriptions of Yaxchilan, Part 2 Estudios de Cultura Maya IV, 1964
 Olmec and Maya Art: Problems of Their Stylistic Relation Dumbarton Oaks Conference on the Olmec, 1968
 Classic Art of Central Veracruz Handbook of Middle American Indians Vol XI, 1971
 Jades from the Cenote of Sacrifice
 Maya History, 1993
 Graphic designs on Mesoamerican pottery
 Maya calendar round dates such as 9 Ahau 17 Mol
 The Maya : An Introduction (with L S Spotnitz, J A Sabloff and G R Willey)

Notes

References

External links
 Maya Writing. David Stuart and Stephen D. Houston (1989); Scientific American
 Morley Hires Tatiana Proskouriakoff (PDF). Villela, Khristaan D. (2000); Precolumbian Art Research Institute Journal
 Guatemala, Cradle of the Maya Civilization

1909 births
1985 deaths
People from Tomsk
People from Tomsk Governorate
Emigrants from the Russian Empire to the United States
Mayanists
American Mesoamericanists
Women Mesoamericanists
Mesoamerican epigraphers
Mesoamerican archaeologists
Mesoamerican artists
20th-century Mesoamericanists
Linguists from Russia
Women linguists
American people of Russian descent
University of Pennsylvania alumni
Penn State College of Arts and Architecture alumni
Order of the Quetzal
American women archaeologists
Russian women archaeologists
20th-century archaeologists
20th-century Russian women writers
20th-century American women writers
University of Pennsylvania Museum of Archaeology and Anthropology
Members of the American Philosophical Society